"Silent Lucidity" is a power ballad by the American rock band Queensrÿche from the 1990 album Empire.  The song, which was composed by lead guitarist Chris DeGarmo, was the biggest hit for the band, peaking at #9 on the Billboard Hot 100 and at #1 on the Billboard Album Rock Tracks chart. "Silent Lucidity" was also nominated in 1992 for the Grammy Awards for Best Rock Song and Best Rock Vocal Performance by a Duo or Group.

Track listing

Original 1991 release
 "Silent Lucidity" – 5:49
 "The Mission" [Live] – 6:17
 "Eyes of a Stranger [Live] – 8:03

Chart performance

Weekly charts

Year-end charts

Personnel
Geoff Tate – lead vocals, keyboards
Chris DeGarmo – lead guitar, backing vocals
Michael Wilton – rhythm guitar
Eddie Jackson – bass, backing vocals
Scott Rockenfield – drums

Additional personnel
Michael Kamen – orchestrator / conductor

Accolades

See also
List of Billboard Mainstream Rock number-one songs of 1991

References

External links
Video clip on YouTube.
 

1990 songs
1990s ballads
1991 singles
Art rock songs
EMI America Records singles
Glam metal ballads
Queensrÿche songs
Song recordings produced by Peter Collins (record producer)
Songs written by Chris DeGarmo